Akharpara is a village in Jhalokati District in the Barisal Division of southern-central Bangladesh.

References

External links
 Satellite map at Maplandia.com

Populated places in Jhalokati District